Cumbernauld East is one of the twenty-one wards used to elect members of the North Lanarkshire Council. It currently elects four councillors.

It was created in 2007 as Abronhill, Kildrum and the Village, covering those neighbourhoods within the town of Cumbernauld: Abronhill, Kildrum and The Village, returning three members. A 2017 boundary change led to the name being altered to a more general geographic description due to the town centre commercial area and the Seafar neighbourhood (excepting the McGregor Road area) being added, the electorate increasing sufficiently to return an additional councillor. In 2019, the ward had a population of 16,570.

Councillors

Election Results

2017 Election

On 19 June 2018, SNP Councillor Paddy Hogg of resigned from the party, describing the SNP group as 'toxic'; he thereafter sat as an Independent.

2012 Election

2007 Election

References

Wards of North Lanarkshire
Cumbernauld